Ringwood East is a suburb of Melbourne, Victoria, Australia, 25 km east of Melbourne's Central Business District, located within the City of Maroondah local government area. Ringwood East recorded a population of 10,764 at the 2021 census.

It is located in the "Green Belt" of Melbourne, with much of the native vegetation and wildlife preserved in areas such as Wombalono Park and its surrounding suburban streets.

The access to high performing public schools, such as Ringwood Secondary College, as well as renowned private schools Tintern Grammar and Aquinas College, is leading to high demand for housing in Ringwood East. The area is now being seen as a real life-style option by people who may have previously looked to areas, such as Balwyn and Camberwell, for quality schools.

Ringwood East has its own railway station which is within the Myki Zone 2 fare zone on the Lilydale railway line. Maroondah Hospital is also located in Ringwood East, a large public hospital and emergency department serving the surrounding eastern suburbs.

Ringwood East Post Office opened around 1902, in what was then a rural area, before the railway station opened in 1925.

Burnt Bridge
Burnt Bridge is a locality within the suburb of Ringwood East. It is named after the Burnt Bridge Hotel, which was operated by Elizabeth Moore and Lucy Dawson as early as the 1840s and was located along the Lilydale Trail, near the present-day junction of Maroondah Highway, Old Lilydale Road and Beaufort Roads. At the time of the hotel's existence, the area was grazing land. Hotels in these times usually began as shanties, selling coffee to passing coaches, before gaining their liquor licences.

Although some historians have speculated that the name is derived from the Scottish word 'burn', meaning 'stream', it is more popularly believed to be derived from a canvas toll bridge in the area, which was burnt down. The hotel was also known to locals as 'The Blazing Stump'.

The shopping precinct serves residents from both sides of Maroondah Highway and from as far as Mount Dandenong Road. Burnt Bridge has a post office, pharmacy, supermarket, bakeries, cafe and takeaways.

Sporting clubs
The suburb has an Australian Rules football team, the East Ringwood Roos, competing in the Eastern Football League.

They are based at the reserve located on the corner of Mount Dandenong Road and Dublin Road but used to play on a field which is now the site of Maroondah Hospital. The East Ringwood Cricket Club and Tennis Club are also based at the reserve.

Education

Primary schools 
 Eastwood Primary School & Deaf Facility
 Tinternvale Primary School

Combined schools 
 Tintern Grammar

See also
 City of Ringwood – Ringwood East was previously within this former local government area.
 Ringwood East railway station – railway station on the Lilydale line
 Maroondah City Council – the local government area of Ringwood East

References

External links
 City of Maroondah

Suburbs of Melbourne
Suburbs of the City of Maroondah
Ringwood, Victoria